Forever  is a studio album by Aled Jones and is his first non-seasonal studio album in four years. This album reached number 46 in the UK Album Chart.

Track listing
 Majesty
 Feels Like Home
 Bridge Over Troubled Water
 A Living Prayer - Duet with Beth Nielsen Chapman
 Forever
 Hushabye Mountain
 Let It Be Me
 The First Time Ever I Saw Your Face
 We Can Be Kind
 Footprints
 I Will
 Better Than I
 That'll Do

2011 albums
Aled Jones albums